Amberley Mount to Sullington Hill is a  biological Site of Special Scientific Interest south-west of Storrington in West Sussex.

This site has chalk grassland and scrub on the slope of the South Downs. It has several unusual butterflies, moths and snails, including the light feathered rustic and juniper carpet moths and the rare Adonis blue butterfly.

References

Sites of Special Scientific Interest in West Sussex